The Lower Burdekin languages were probably three distinct Australian Aboriginal languages spoken around the mouth of the Burdekin River in north Queensland. One short wordlist in each was collected in the 19th century, and published in the second volume of The Australian Race in 1886. These languages have since gone extinct, with no more having been recorded. Due to the paucity of the available data, almost nothing of their grammatical structure is known.

The O'Connor language goes by the name Yuru, and may have been Dyirbalic; others may have been Maric. However, Breen analyzed two of the lists and concluded that they were different languages, neither Maric. He presumes that one of them was Bindal.

References

Extinct languages of Queensland
Northeast Pama–Nyungan languages